Rani Raja is an Indian Malayalam-language soap opera directed by director Purushothaman V. The show premiered on 10 October 2022 on Mazhavil Manorama and aires on-demand through ManoramaMAX. It stars Archana Kavi (later replaced by Mridula Vijay) in the lead role along with Darish Jayaseelan and Poojitha Menon.

Cast
Archana Kavi / Mridula Vijay as Anamika Haridasan (Aami), eldest daughter of Haridasan and Sudhamani.
Darish Jayaseelan as Rishi, son of Mahadevan Thampi and Vinodini.
Poojitha Menon as Priyamvatha, former girl friend of Rishi.
Manju Satheesh as Sudhamani
Om Sha as Haridasan
Raji Menon / Devi Chandana as Vinodhini
Shivadas Menon as Mahadevan Thampi
Manve Surendran as Keerthi, eldest daughter of Mahadevan Thampi and Vinodini.
Disney James as Gopan, husband of Keerthi.
Bindu Ramakrishnan as Koushalya, mother of Mahadevan Thampi
Soniya Baiju Kottarakkara 
Archana Thampi as Nikita, youngest daughter of Mahadevan Thampi and Vinodini.
Aleena Sajan as Kalyani Das
Shilpa as Saniya
Thushara Nambiar as Karishma
Teena Linson as Thara
Nitika as Anitha
Jiffin George as Gaadha 
Sumesh as Manjunath 
Lal Mutta Thara as Ratheendran 
Prashant Kanjiramattom as Johnappan

References

2022 films
2020s Malayalam-language films